A Whale for the Killing is an American television film that aired on ABC on February 1, 1981. It is loosely based on a true story by environmentalist Farley Mowat, about a whale that is tortured by a fisherman. The incident happened near Burgeo, Newfoundland, while Mowat & family lived there.

The film, based on Mowat's 1972 book of the same name, received two Primetime Emmy nominations.

The later Canadian singer Alan Doyle starred as a boy on a bridge in the movie. In 2012 he released his solo album Boy on Bridge which paid tribute to the role.

Soundtrack
The soundtrack is available on CD from BSX Records. The score was composed by Basil Poledouris.  Also included on the same CD is the soundtrack to the 1992 theatrical film Wind, also composed by Poledouris.

References

1981 drama films
Drama films based on actual events
ABC network original films
American drama television films
Films about animal rights
Films about whales
Films based on non-fiction books
Films set in Newfoundland and Labrador
Films scored by Basil Poledouris
1981 films
Films directed by Richard T. Heffron
1980s American films